Connor Jeffrey Smith (born December 1, 1994) is an American professional ice hockey forward currently with the Hartford Wolf Pack in the American Hockey League (AHL) while under contract to the New York Rangers of the National Hockey League (NHL).

Playing career

Amateur
Smith grew up playing hockey in Des Moines before moving with his family to Minnesota when he was 14.
He played college hockey for UMass Lowell of Hockey East for three seasons while majoring in chemistry.
In his freshman season at UMass, Smith was named to the All Hockey East Rookie Team after he led the team with 16 goals, 19 assists for a total of 35 points. He also became the first River Hawk rookie since Scott Wilson in 2011 to score 30 points in a season. On April 21, Smith and Zack Kamrass were awarded the UMass Lowell Hockey Most Valuable Player Award. Smith was also awarded the River Hawks Rookie of the Year.

In his sophomore year, Smith was named to the Hockey East All-Tournament Team and won the River Hawks leading scorer award. He recorded his first career hat trick in an 8–1 win over Arizona State on January 30, 2016. In the 2016 Hockey East Men's Ice Hockey Tournament, Smith helped Massachusetts–Lowell beat Boston University in the Quarterfinals to advance to the Semifinals and eventually the Championship. UMass lost in the Championship match against Northeastern 3–2.

In his junior year, Smith was named a semi-finalist for the Walter Brown Award as the best American-born college hockey player in New England. The River Hawks won the 2017 Hockey East Men's Ice Hockey Tournament and Smith was named to the All Tournament Team and Tournament MVP. On March 29, 2017, Smith chose to forgo his senior year at UMass and signed as an undrafted free agent by the National Hockey League's Buffalo Sabres.

Professional

Smith made his Sabres debut on April 2, 2017 in a 4–2 loss to the New York Islanders, in which he also got his first NHL point with an assist on a goal by Evander Kane. When Smith made his debut, he became one of only two players in league history to have been born in the state of Iowa, joining goaltender Scott Clemmensen.

Smith played the 2017–18 season with the Sabres American Hockey League (AHL) affiliate, the Rochester Americans. In his rookie season with the Americans, Smith was named to the 2018 AHL All-Star Classic on January 4, 2018. On July 16, 2018, Smith signed a one-year, two way contract with the Sabres worth $874,125.

Smith began the following season with the Rochester Americans after being cut from the Sabres training camp. On January 8, 2019, Smith scored his first NHL goal in the second period against the New Jersey Devils.

As a free agent after five seasons within the Sabres organization, Smith was signed to a one-year, two-way contract with the Carolina Hurricanes on July 28, 2021.

On August 2, 2022, Smith was signed as a free agent to a one-year, two-way contract with the New York Rangers.

Career statistics

Awards and honors

References

External links
 

1994 births
American men's ice hockey left wingers
Buffalo Sabres players
Carolina Hurricanes players
Chicago Steel players
Chicago Wolves players
Hartford Wolf Pack players
Ice hockey people from Iowa
Living people
Muskegon Lumberjacks players
Rochester Americans players
Sportspeople from Des Moines, Iowa
UMass Lowell River Hawks men's ice hockey players
Undrafted National Hockey League players